Thutmose was the eldest son of Pharaoh Amenhotep III and Queen Tiye, who lived during the Eighteenth Dynasty of Egypt.  His early death led to the reign of Akhenaten, his younger brother—as the successor to the Egyptian throne—and the intrigues of the century leading up to Ramesses II, the start and ultimately the failure of Atenism, the Amarna letters, and the changing roles of the kingdom's powers.

Life

Prince Thutmose served as a priest of Ptah in ancient Memphis. His full royal titles were "Crown Prince, Overseer of the Priests of Upper and Lower Egypt, High Priest of Ptah in Memphis and Sm-priest (of Ptah)." 

He is known from a relatively small number of objects. A small schist statuette in the Louvre Museum shows the prince as a miller and another small schist statue in Berlin depicts him as a mummy lying on a bier. The miller statuette is inscribed on three sides with this text:
 (right)...the king's son the sem-priest Djhutmose; (left) I am the servant of this noble god, his miller; (front) Incense for the Ennead of the western necropolis. 

Prince Thutmose is best remembered for the limestone sarcophagus of his cat, Ta-miu (she-cat), now in the Cairo Museum. The cat sarcophagus of Prince Thutmose conclusively establishes that he was indeed the eldest son of Amenhotep III, since it provides his then current title of 'Crown Prince.' Thutmose is also attested by a total of 7 pairs of calcite and pottery vases in the Louvre.

Prince Thutmose disappears from the public records and appears to have died some time during the third decade of Amenhotep III's kingship,  fairly late. In his place, his younger brother Amenhotep IV, later known as Akhenaten, succeeded to the throne.

References

14th-century BC Egyptian people
14th-century BC clergy
Memphis High Priests of Ptah
Princes of the Eighteenth Dynasty of Egypt
Children of Amenhotep III
Heirs to the ancient Egyptian throne
Heirs apparent who never acceded